He Xiaoqiang (born 5 June 2002) is a Chinese footballer currently playing as a left-back for Beijing Guoan.

Club career
He Xiaoqiang would be promoted to the senior team of Beijing Guoan and would go on to make his debut in a 2020 Chinese FA Cup on 28 November 2020 against Chengdu Better City in a 1-0 victory. The following season in June 2021, despite not having registered a single league appearance with the club's first team, yet, he was given an opportunity to shine on a continental level, as Beijing and the other Chinese teams involved in the AFC Champions League group stage sent a mix of reserves and youth players to the centralized venues: in fact, most of the senior players were still dealing with self-isolating measures to contrast COVID-19 following international matches, so the clubs involved chose to keep them in China, valuing performances in the national top-tier league over ACL fixtures. He would make his continental debut in a AFC Champions League game on 29 June 2021 against Kawasaki Frontale in a 7-0 defeat. He would go on to make his debut in a league game on 23 December 2022 against Guangzhou F.C. in a 3-1 victory.

Career statistics
.

References

External links
He Xiaoqiang at Worldfootball.net

2002 births
Living people
Chinese footballers
Association football defenders
Beijing Guoan F.C. players